Liz McJorrow is a former netball player who played for the New Zealand national netball team on ten occasions in the mid-1980s.

Career
Elizabeth Wendy McJorrow (née Nielson) was born on 29 January 1960. Playing netball for Wellington East, she was first selected to play for the Silver Ferns, the national netball team, in 1986, playing her first test match against Australia on 6 May. She played in the Goal keeper (GK) and Goal defence (GD) positions.

McJorrow married Scott McJorrow. She became a teacher and taught at Naenae Intermediate School in Lower Hutt in the Wellington Region on the North Island of New Zealand. Among her extracurricular activities was teaching young children to play water polo at Hutt Water Polo Club.

References

1960 births
Living people
New Zealand international netball players